Parabangalaia flavosignata is a species of beetle in the family Cerambycidae, and the only species in the genus Parabangalaia. It was described by Stephan von Breuning in 1946.

References

Prosopocerini
Beetles described in 1946